A Certain Mister (French: Un certain monsieur) is a 1950 French crime film directed by Yves Ciampi and starring René Dary, Hélène Perdrière and Pierre Destailles. It was shot at the Billancourt Studios in Paris. The film's sets were designed by the art director Lucien Carré. The script is based on Jean Le Hallier's 1947 novel of the same title.

Synopsis
When documents vital to French national security are stolen, the police join forces with three master criminals in order to recover them.

Cast 

 Hélène Perdrière as L'Index, member of the band
 René Dary as Le Pouce, member of the band
 Pierre Destailles as Le Majeur, member of the band
 Louis Seigner as Commissioner Clergé
 Marc Cassot as inspector César alias André Paris 
 Junie Astor as Edmée Lamour
 Lise Delamare as Mrs. Lecorduvent
 Louis de Funès as Thomas Boudeboeuf, journalist of "l'avenir Sauveterrois"
 Alice Field as Mrs. Léonard
 Julienne Paroli as La bigote
 Paulette Andrieux as Mademoiselle Germaine Sabrelong, la fille du notaire
 René Blancard as Le commissaire Bellefontaine
 Roland Toutain as  Un complice
 Emile Genevois as Un complice
 Julien Maffre as Un complice
 Paul Demange as Léonard
 Tony Taffin as Ottavio
 Robert Lussac as Hector
 Henri Vilbert as Antoine
 Alexandre Mihalesco as Alexandre Lecorduvent, antiquaire
 Titys as Un vieux monsieur
 Guy Favières as Le sacristain
 Catherine Arley
 Claude Castaing
 Jacques Sablon
 Edmond Tamiz
 Jean-Paul Moulinot
 Charles Bayard
 Emile Remongin
 Louis Bugette

References

Bibliography
 Goble, Alan. The Complete Index to Literary Sources in Film. Walter de Gruyter, 1999.
 Vincendeau, Ginette . Stars and Stardom in French Cinema. Bloomsbury Publishing, 2000.

External links 
 
 Un certain monsieur (1949) at the Films de France

1950 films
French crime films
1950s French-language films
French black-and-white films
Films directed by Yves Ciampi
1950 crime films
1950s French films
Films based on French novels
Films shot at Billancourt Studios